The Belgian Sports Personality of the Year is a defunct annual sports award that was given out in January by the Belgian newspaper Het Nieuwsblad to the greatest personality in Belgian sports. It was last handed out in 2008. For this award, not only athletes qualified but everyone who was involved in sports, thus including amongst others trainers, coaches and athletes themselves. A person could only win this award once in his career.

List of winners

See also
Belgian Sportsman of the year

Belgian sports trophies and awards
Awards established in 1998
Awards disestablished in 2008